People with the surname  Schjøtt
Aase Schiøtt Jacobsen
Hagbarth  Schjøtt, Jr.
Hagbarth  Schjøtt, Sr.
Halfdan Schjøtt
Ivar Schjøtt
Karl Eirik Schjøtt-Pedersen
Mathilde  Schjøtt
Mie Schjøtt-Kristensen
Ole Hersted  Schjøtt
Peter Olrog  Schjøtt
Sofie Schjøtt
Steinar Schjøtt
Trygve  Schjøtt